Cosmic Voyage may refer to:
 Cosmic Voyage (1996 film), a short documentary film
 Cosmic Voyage (1936 film), a Soviet science fiction silent film